Mahmoud Baligh is a politician from Afghanistan. He is the former governor of Daykundi province. Baligh was appointed governor of Daykundi on July 26, 2017 instead of Masooma Muradi.
On November 22, 2018 Sayed Anwar Rahmati was appointed as the new governor of Daykundi inplace of him.

Early life 
Mahmoud Baligh was born in 1971 in Daikundi, Afghanistan.

See also 
 List of governors of Daykundi
 List of Hazara people

References 

Living people
1971 births
Hazara politicians
Governors of Daykundi Province
People from Daykundi Province